commonly abbreviated as Nintendo SPD, was a Japanese research, planning and development division housed inside the Nintendo Development Center in Kyoto, Japan. The division had two departments: Software Planning & Development Department, which primarily co-produced games with external developers; and Software Development & Design Department, which primarily developed experimental and system software. The division was created during a corporate restructuring in September 2003, with the abolition of the Nintendo R&D1 and Nintendo R&D2 departments.

The group had the task of independently developing innovative games, assisting other development teams on projects, and managing overseas production of first-party franchises. Both SPD and SDD departments were divided into four separate groups, which worked concurrently on different projects.

In September 2015, Nintendo SPD merged with Nintendo's other software development division, Entertainment Analysis & Development (EAD), becoming Nintendo Entertainment Planning & Development.

History

In 2003, then-Nintendo president Satoru Iwata created the Software Planning & Development division, appointing himself as its general manager. The goal of the newly created division would be to focus on co-producing and supervising external second-party video game development, with the goal of relieving the Entertainment Analysis & Development (EAD) division, and its general manager Shigeru Miyamoto, to focus on internal development. Although that was the division's primary focus, it also went on to develop some video games titles internally.

On June 27, 2013, deputy general manager Shinya Takahashi replaced Satoru Iwata as general manager of the division, gaining a seat in Nintendo's board of directors in the process. A year later, on June 18, 2014, all of Nintendo's internal research and development divisions, including the SPD division, were moved from the Nintendo's headquarters in Kyoto to the newly built Nintendo Development Center, just 300 meters from the old building. By centralizing all of its developers in the new building, Nintendo hoped they would deeply interact with each other, regardless of which division and field they were working on, creating a synergy between hardware and software development.

On September 16, 2015, the division was merged with Nintendo's internal software development division, Entertainment Analysis & Development, becoming Nintendo Entertainment Planning & Development (EPD). As Shigeru Miyamoto retired as general manager of the EAD division and went on to become a Creative Fellow, former SPD general manager Shinya Takahashi took his place as general manager of the newly created EPD division, thus supervising all video games developed at Nintendo. The new division accumulated all of its predecessors roles as both developing video games internally and co-producing them with external developers.

Structure
The General Manager of the Nintendo Software Planning & Development Division was Shinya Takahashi, assisted by both Keizo Kato, the Assistant Manager and Kensuke Tanabe, the Executive Officer. The division was split into two different departments: the Software Planning & Development Department, which was split into four separate groups, which was supervised by Deputy Manager Yoshio Sakamoto; and the Software Development & Design Department which was split into three separate groups, supervised by Deputy Manager Masaru Nishita. All of the groups worked concurrently on different projects.

Software Planning & Development Department

Production Group No. 1
The Production Group No. 1's primary focus was the development and production of video game software and software applications for Nintendo home and handheld consoles, as well as software for peripherals developed for said consoles, both internally and in cooperation with second-party developers. The group manager and main producer was Nintendo-veteran Yoshio Sakamoto. The group is responsible for developing and producing games in the WarioWare, Rhythm Heaven, Card Hero, Tomodachi and the mainline Metroid series.

Notes

Production Group No. 2
The Production Group No. 2 was led by manager and video game producer Hitoshi Yamagami. The group was primarily responsible for co-producing and supervising video games published by Nintendo and developed by third-party developers from Japan. They're responsible for producing and supervising games in the Pokémon, F-Zero, Legendary Starfy, Fire Emblem, Dr. Mario, Endless Ocean, Fossil Fighters, Style Savvy and Xenoblade Chronicles series.

In addition to co-producing games, the group also supervised the development of Drill Dozer, developed by Game Freak.

{| class="wikitable sortable plainrowheaders" style="text-align: center;"
|+ List of video games co-produced by the Nintendo SPD Production Group No. 2
|-
! scope="col" | 
! scope="col" | Title
!Series
! scope="col" | Genre(s)
! scope="col" | Platform(s)
! class="unsortable" scope="col" | 

|- 
| rowspan="2" | 2003
! scope="row" | Pokémon Colosseum
| Pokémon
| Role-playing
| GameCube
| 
|-
! scope="row" | F-Zero: GP Legend
| F-Zero
| Racing
| Game Boy Advance
| 
|- 
| rowspan="6" | 2004
! scope="row" | Pokémon FireRed and LeafGreen
| Pokémon
| Role-playing
| Game Boy Advance
| 
|- 
! scope="row" | Densetsu no Stafy 3
| The Legendary Starfy
| Platform
| Game Boy Advance
| 
|- 
! scope="row" | Pokémon Emerald
| Pokémon
| Role-playing
| Game Boy Advance
| 
|- 
! scope="row" | Fire Emblem: The Sacred Stones
| Fire Emblem
| Tactical role playing
| Game Boy Advance
| 
|- 
! scope="row" | F-Zero: Climax
| F-Zero
| Racing
| Game Boy Advance
| 
|- 
! scope="row" | Pokémon Dash
| Pokémon
| Racing
| Nintendo DS
| 

|-
| rowspan="11" | 2005
! scope="row" | Yakuman DS
| Yakuman
| Puzzle
| Nintendo DS
| 
|-
! scope="row" | Fire Emblem: Path of Radiance
| Fire Emblem
| Tactical role-playing
| GameCube
| 
|-
! scope="row" | Nonono Puzzle Chalien
| 
| Puzzle
| Game Boy Advance
|
|-
! scope="row" | Advance Wars: Dual Strike
| Wars
| Turn-based tactics
| Nintendo DS
| 
|-
! scope="row" | Dance Dance Revolution: Mario Mix
| 
| Music, exergaming
| GameCube
| 
|-
! scope="row" | Pokémon XD: Gale of Darkness
| Pokémon
| Role-playing
| GameCube
| 
|-
! scope="row" | Jump Super Stars
| 
| Fighting
| Nintendo DS
| 
|- 
! scope="row" | Dr. Mario & Puzzle League
| 
| Puzzle
| Game Boy Advance
| 
|-
! scope="row" | 
| Pokémon
| Puzzle
| Nintendo DS
| 
|- 
! scope="row" | Super Princess Peach
| Mario
| Platform
| Nintendo DS
| 
|- 
! scope="row" | Pokémon Mystery Dungeon: Blue Rescue Team and Red Rescue Team
| Pokémon
| Roguelike
| Nintendo DS
| 
|-
| rowspan="9" | 2006
! scope="row" | Tetris DS
| Tetris
| Puzzle
| Nintendo DS
| 
|-
! scope="row" | Densetsu no Stafy 4
| The Legendary Starfy
| Platform
| Nintendo DS
| 
|-
! scope="row" | Mawashite Tsunageru Touch Panic
| 
| Puzzle
| Nintendo DS
|
|-
! scope="row" | Project Hacker: Kakusei
| 
| Graphic adventure
| Nintendo DS
|
|- 
! scope="row" | Chōsōjū Mecha MG
| 
| Fighting
| Nintendo DS
| 
|-
! scope="row" | Wi-Fi Taiō Yakuman DS
| Yakuman
| Puzzle
| Nintendo DS
| 
|- 
! scope="row" | Pokémon Diamond and Pearl
| Pokémon
| Role-playing
| Nintendo DS
| 
|-
! scope="row" | Jump Ultimate Stars
| 
| Fighting
| Nintendo DS
| 
|-
! scope="row" | Pokémon Battle Revolution
| Pokémon
| Turn-based strategy
| Wii
| 
|-
| rowspan="12" | 2007
! scope="row" | Wario: Master of Disguise
| Wario
| Platform
| Nintendo DS
| 
|-
! scope="row" | Picross DS
| Picross
| Puzzle
| Nintendo DS
| 
|-
! scope="row" | Fire Emblem: Radiant Dawn
| Fire Emblem
| Tactical role-playing
| Wii
| 
|-
! scope="row" | Planet Puzzle League
| Puzzle League
| Puzzle
| Nintendo DS
| 
|-
! scope="row" | Kurikin Nano Island Story
| 
| Role-playing
| Nintendo DS
| 
|- 
! scope="row" | Brain Age 2: More Training in Minutes a Day
| Brain Age
| Edutainment
| Nintendo DS
| 
|- 
! scope="row" | Ganbaru Watashi no Kakei Diary
| 
| Digital diary
| Nintendo DS
|
|- 
! scope="row" | Endless Ocean
| Endless Ocean
| Adventure, simulation
| Wii
| 
|-
! scope="row" | Zekkyō Senshi Sakeburein
| 
| Beat 'em up
| Nintendo DS
|
|- 
! scope="row" | Pokémon Mystery Dungeon: Explorers of Time and Explorers of Darkness
| Pokémon
| Roguelike
| Nintendo DS
| 
|- 
! scope="row" | ASH: Archaic Sealed Heat
| 
| Tactical role-playing
| Nintendo DS
| 
|- 
! scope="row" | DS Bungaku Zenshuu
| 
| E-reader
| Nintendo DS
|
|-
| rowspan="14" | 2008
! scope="row" | Wii Chess
| Wii
| Chess
| Wii
| 
|-
! scope="row" | Advance Wars: Days of Ruin
| Wars
| Turn-based tactics
| Nintendo DS
| 
|-
! scope="row" | 
| Dr. Mario
| Puzzle
| Wii
| 
|- 
! scope="row" | Fossil Fighters
| Fossil Fighters
| Role-playing
| Nintendo DS
| 
|-
! scope="row" | Yakuman Wii: Ide Yosuke no Kenkou Mahjong
| Yakuman
| Puzzle
| Wii
| 
|-
! scope="row" | The Legendary Starfy
| The Legendary Starfy
| Platform
| Nintendo DS
| 
|-
! scope="row" | Tsuushin Taikyoku: Hayazashi Shogi Sandan
| 
| Puzzle
| Wii
| 
|-
! scope="row" | Tsuushin Taikyoku: Igo Dojo 2700-Mon
| 
| Puzzle
| Wii
| 
|-
! scope="row" | Fire Emblem: Shadow Dragon
| Fire Emblem
| Tactical role-playing
| Nintendo DS
| 
|- 
! scope="row" | Pokémon Platinum
| Pokémon
| Role-playing
| Nintendo DS
| 
|-
! scope="row" | Disaster: Day of Crisis
| 
| Action-adventure
| Wii
| 
|- 
! scope="row" | Style Savvy
| Style Savvy
| Simulation
| Nintendo DS
|
|-
! scope="row" | Dr. Mario ExpressA Little Bit of... Dr. Mario 
| Dr. Mario
| Puzzle
| Wii
|
|-
! scope="row" | 100 Classic Book Collection
| 
| E-reader
| Nintendo DS
|
|-
| rowspan="12" | 2009
! scope="row" | Puzzle League Express
| Puzzle League
| Puzzle
| Nintendo DSi
| 
|-
! scope="row" | Yōsuke Ide no Kenkō Mahjong DSi
| 
| Puzzle
| Nintendo DSi
| 
|-
! scope="row" | Pokémon Mystery Dungeon: Explorers of Sky
| Pokémon
|
| Nintendo DS
|
|-
! scope="row" | Sparkle Snapshots
|
|
|
|
|-
! scope="row" | Pokémon Rumble
| Pokémon
|
| Wii
|
|-
! scope="row" | Pokémon Mystery Dungeon: Adventure Team
| Pokémon
|
| Wii
|
|-
! scope="row" | Ganbaru Watashi no Osaifu Ouendan
| 
| 
| Nintendo DSi
|
|-
! scope="row" | Metal Torrent
| 
| Shooter
| Nintendo DSi
| 
|-
! scope="row" | Pokémon HeartGold and SoulSilver
| Pokémon
| Role-playing
| Nintendo DS
| 
|-
! scope="row" | 
| Endless Ocean
| Adventure, simulation
| Wii
|
|-
! scope="row" | 
| Sin and Punishment
| Shoot 'em up
| Wii
|
|-
! scope="row" | PokéPark Wii: Pikachu's Adventure
| Pokémon
|
| Wii
|
|-
| rowspan="6" | 2010
! scope="row" | Zangeki no Reginleiv
| 
|
| Wii
|
|-
! scope="row" | Xenoblade Chronicles
| Xenoblade Chronicles
| Action role-playing
| Wii
|
|- 
! scope="row" | Fire Emblem: New Mystery of the Emblem
| Fire Emblem
| Tactical role-playing
| Nintendo DS
|
|-
! scope="row" | ThruSpace
|
|
|
|
|- 
! scope="row" | Pokémon Black and Pokémon White
| Pokémon
| Role-playing
| Nintendo DS
| 
|- 
! scope="row" | Fossil Fighters: Champions
| Fossil Fighters
| Role-playing
| Nintendo DS

|-
| rowspan="13" | 2011
! scope="row" | The Last Story
| 
| Action role-playing
| Wii
| 
|-
! scope="row" | Learn with Pokémon: Typing Adventure
| Pokémon
|
| Nintendo DS
|
|- 
! scope="row" | Pandora's Tower
| 
| Action role-playing
| Wii
|
|-
! scope="row" | Pokédex 3D
| Pokémon
|
| Nintendo 3DS
|
|-
! scope="row" | Ketzal's Corridors
| 
|
| Nintendo 3DS
|
|-
! scope="row" | Kirby's Return to Dream Land
| Kirby
|
| Wii
|
|-
! scope="row" | PokéPark 2: Wonders Beyond
| Pokémon
|
| Wii
|
|-
! scope="row" | 3D Classics: Excitebike
| 3D Classics
| Racing
| Nintendo 3DS
| 
|-
! scope="row" | 3D Classics: Xevious
| 3D Classics
| Shoot 'em up
| Nintendo 3DS
| 
|-
! scope="row" | 3D Classics: Urban Champion
| 3D Classics
| Fighting
| Nintendo 3DS
| 
|-
! scope="row" | 3D Classics: Twinbee
| 3D Classics
| Shoot 'em up
| Nintendo 3DS
| 
|-
! scope="row" | 3D Classics: Kirby's Adventure
| 3D Classics
| Platform, action 
| Nintendo 3DS
| 
|-
! scope="row" | 3D Classics: Kid Icarus
| 3D Classics
| Action, platform
| Nintendo 3DS
| 

|-
| rowspan="8" | 2012
! scope="row" | Fire Emblem Awakening
| Fire Emblem
| Tactical role-playing
| Nintendo 3DS
|
|-
! scope="row" | Pokémon Black 2 and Pokémon White 2
| Pokémon
| Role-playing
| Nintendo DS
| 
|-
! scope="row" | Pokémon Dream Radar
| Pokémon
|
|Nintendo 3DS
|
|-
! scope="row" | Pokédex 3D Pro
| Pokémon
|
| Nintendo 3DS
|
|-
! scope="row" | HarmoKnight
|
| Rhythm
| Nintendo 3DS
| 
|-
! scope="row" | Style Savvy: Trendsetters
| Style Savvy
| Simulation
| Nintendo 3DS
|
|-
! scope="row" | Wii Karaoke U
|
|
|Wii U
|
|-
! scope="row" | Pokémon Mystery Dungeon: Gates to Infinity
|Pokémon
|
|Nintendo 3DS
|
|-
| rowspan="4" | 2013
! scope="row" | Pokémon Rumble U
|Pokémon
|Action role-playing
|Wii U
|
|-
! scope="row" | The Wonderful 101
|
|Action
|Wii U
|
|-
! scope="row" | Pokémon X and Pokémon Y
|Pokémon
| Role-playing
| Nintendo 3DS
|
|-
! scope="row" | Dr. Luigi
|
| Puzzle
| Wii U
|
|-
| rowspan="9" | 2014
! scope="row" | Kirby: Triple Deluxe
|Kirby
| 
| Nintendo 3DS
|
|-
! scope="row" | Fossil Fighters: Frontier
|
| Role-playing
| Nintendo 3DS
|
|-
! scope="row" | {{Unbulleted list|Pokémon Battle Trozei|Pokémon Link: Battle! scope="row" |  }}
|Pokémon
| 
| Nintendo 3DS
|
|- 
! scope="row" | Pokémon Art Academy|
| 
| Nintendo 3DS
|
|- 
! scope="row" | Dedede's Drum Dash Deluxe|Kirby
| 
| Nintendo 3DS
|
|-
! scope="row" | Kirby Fighters Deluxe|Kirby
| 
| Nintendo 3DS
|
|-
! scope="row" | Bayonetta|Bayonetta
| 
| Wii U
|
|-
! scope="row" | Bayonetta 2|Bayonetta
| 
| Wii U
|
|-
! scope="row" | Pokémon Omega Ruby and Alpha Sapphire|Pokémon
| Role-playing
| Nintendo 3DS
| 

|-
| rowspan="8" | 2015
! scope="row" | Pokémon Shuffle|Pokémon
| Puzzle
| Nintendo 3DS
| 
|-
! scope="row" | Code Name: S.T.E.A.M.|
| Turn-based strategy
| Nintendo 3DS
| 
|-
! scope="row" | Pokémon Rumble World|Pokémon
| Action role-playing
| Nintendo 3DS
| 
|-
! scope="row" | Style Savvy: Fashion Forward|Style Savvy
| Simulation
| Nintendo 3DS
| 
|-
! scope="row" | Xenoblade Chronicles X|Xenoblade Chronicles
| Action role-playing
| Wii U
| 
|-
! scope="row" | Fire Emblem Fates|Fire Emblem
| Tactical role-playing
| Nintendo 3DS
| 
|-
! scope="row" | Devil's Third|
| Action-adventure, hack and slash, shooter
| Wii U
| 
|-
! scope="row" | Real Dasshutsu Game x Nintendo 3DS|
|
|Nintendo 3DS
|
|}

Notes

Production Group No. 3
The Production Group No. 3 was led by producer Kensuke Tanabe and responsible for overseeing the development of titles from the Metroid Prime, Battalion Wars, Super Mario Strikers, Mario vs. Donkey Kong, Excite, Paper Mario, Fluidity, and Donkey Kong Country series.

Notes

Production Group No. 4
The Production Group No. 4 was led by Toshiharu Izuno and responsible for overseeing the development of titles from the Mario Party, Mario Sports, Mario & Luigi, Yoshi, Donkey Kong, and Wii Party series.

Notes
 Co-production with Eighting.
 Co-production with NDcube.
 Co-production with Cing.
 Co-production with Hudson.
 Co-production with INiS.
 Co-production with Camelot.
 Co-production with Paon.
 Co-production with AlphaDream.
 Co-production with Project Sora and Sora Ltd.
 Co-production with Bandai Namco Studios and Sora Ltd.
 Co-production with Good-Feel.
 Co-production with Arzest.
 Co-production with Artoon.
 Co-production with Namco Bandai Games.

Software Development & Design Department
Deputy Manager: Masaru NishitaNintendo Software Development & Design was an experimental software development team assembled by Nintendo Co., Ltd. president Satoru Iwata. The team was originally assembled as a System Service Task Force that would develop all the unique internal system software for the Nintendo DS and Nintendo Wii. The team was responsible for all the additional Wii Channels, the Nintendo DSi system software and more recently, the Nintendo 3DS system software. Nintendo SDD also went on to develop several innovative retail games. The philosophy behind development was to think out of the box and create unique software in a timely manner with smaller development resources. The development staff was composed of Koichi Kawamoto, who was the original programmer of WarioWare, and Shinya Takahashi, who was a longtime designer at Nintendo EAD. The department was also responsible for developing several subsequent WiiWare and DSiWare software.

Software Development Group
Manager/producer: Kiyoshi Mizuki
Software Development Group was responsible for developing software from the Jam with the Band and Brain Age series, among additional Touch! Generations'' titles with partner developers.

 Co-production with Namco Bandai Games.

Notes

References

Nintendo divisions and subsidiaries
Japanese companies established in 2003
Video game companies established in 2003
Video game companies disestablished in 2015
Defunct video game companies of Japan
Japanese companies disestablished in 2015